Verkhny Suyan (Ürge Höyän) is a rural locality (a village) in Verkhnesuyansky Selsoviet, Karaidelsky District, Bashkortostan, Russia. The population was 17 as of 2010. There is 1 street.

Geography 
Verkhny Suyan is located 74 km northeast of Karaidel (the district's administrative centre) by road. Ust-Bartaga is the nearest rural locality.

References 

Rural localities in Karaidelsky District